Tony Plummer (born January 21, 1947) is a former American football defensive back. He played for the St. Louis Cardinals in 1970, the Atlanta Falcons from 1971 to 1973 and for the Los Angeles Rams in 1974.

References

1947 births
Living people
American football defensive backs
Pacific Tigers football players
St. Louis Cardinals (football) players
Atlanta Falcons players
Los Angeles Rams players